Hand is an unincorporated community in Horry County, South Carolina, United States. Hand is located along SC 90 between Conway and Wampee.

History
A post office called Hand was established in 1888, and remained in operation until 1942. The origin of the name "Hand" is obscure.

References

Unincorporated communities in Horry County, South Carolina
Unincorporated communities in South Carolina